Selim Aitkulov (10 January 1913 – 24 April 1975) was a Tatar soldier of the Red Army and Hero of the Soviet Union. Aitkulov was awarded the title Hero of the Soviet Union and the Order of Lenin for actions during the Battle of the Dnieper, in which he took command of his platoon after his platoon commander was wounded. After the war, Aitkulov was the head of the Uralsk Regional Consumer Union's Organization Department.

Early life 
Selim Aitkulov was born on 10 January 1913 in Muhorsky village in the Ural Oblast to a Tatar peasant family. He graduated from ninth grade in 1930 and worked at a factory in Uralsk.

World War II 
In July 1941, Aitkulov was drafted into the Red Army and fought in combat from September. He fought in the Battle of Kharkov in May 1942. In 1943, he joined the Communist Party of the Soviet Union. In July, Aitkulov fought in the Battle of Kursk. On 31 August  Aitkulov received the Medal "For Courage" for his actions.

At the end of September, Aitkulov was an Efreitor in the 231st Guards Rifle Regiment of the 75th Guards Rifle Division. During the Battle of the Dnieper, he reportedly crossed the Dnieper multiple times on reconnaissance patrols, reportedly discovering intelligence. On 29 September, during fighting in Yasnogorodka village in Vyshhorod Raion, he reportedly took command after his platoon commander was wounded. Allegedly, the platoon repulsed nine German counterattacks. Aitkulov reportedly continued to lead the platoon and repulsed three counterattacks on 5 October. Allegedly, he was severely wounded but stayed in combat and killed four German soldiers with two grenades. On 17 October, Aitkulov was awarded the title Hero of the Soviet Union and the Order of Lenin. After recovering from his wounds, Aitkulov was sent to the Odessa Infantry School and was promoted to junior lieutenant upon graduation. He went back to combat and fought in battles in Poland and Czechoslovakia.

Postwar 
Aitkulov was discharged with the rank of Junior lieutenant. After the end of World War II, Aitkulov returned to Uralsk and worked as the head of the organization department of the regional consumers' union. He died on 24 April 1975 and is buried in Uralsk.

References 

1913 births
1975 deaths
Tatar people
Kazakh Soviet Socialist Republic people
Soviet military personnel of World War II
Heroes of the Soviet Union
Recipients of the Order of Lenin
Recipients of the Medal "For Courage" (Russia)
Communist Party of the Soviet Union members
People from West Kazakhstan Region